Karamaiceras is an extinct cephalopod genus belonging to the Ammonoidea that lived during the Early Cretaceous. Its shell is involute, smooth and rather compressed, with the outer whorl strongly embracing the inner whorls. Sides are flattish to slightly convex and slope inwardly toward a narrowly rounded venter.

References

Karamaiceras-Sokolov in Russian.

Cretaceous ammonites
Fossils of Russia
Albian life
Albian genus extinctions
Placenticeratidae
Ammonitida genera